The Minolta Dynax 7000i, is a 24x36mm auto-focus SLR camera, introduced by Minolta in 1988. It was sold in North America as Maxxum 7000i, and in Japan as α-7700i.

This camera had the usual Program AE, Shutter priority AE, Aperture priority AE and metered manual exposure modes (standard on the 7000), TTL autoflash (like the Minolta 7000) and added a newer faster and more sensitive AF system, faster shutter speed (1/4000s), faster film advance (3 frame/s), new flash hot-shoe that was incompatible with the older flash system. The 7000i supported the Minolta AF lens system, and other accessories such as the remote cords.

Perhaps more innovative than any other improvement was the expansion card system.  While also used in other models in the i-series, some models in the xi-series, and some si-series cameras, the Minolta Creative Expansion Card System debuted on this model.  The expansion card system provided a way to add features to the camera, such as multi-spot metering, or re-program the built-in AE modes to favor faster shutter speeds or smaller apertures, such as the sports action card.  While most of the cards' functions and effects could be duplicated by a technically knowledgeable photographer using the camera without the expansion cards, the card system was handy for less technically skilled users who just wanted to photograph their child's soccer/football team for example, without needing to learn about exposure settings and the effect they might have on how a picture "looked".  This camera directly was squarely aimed at the same market as the Minolta 7000.

External links 

 Camera tech data for Minolta Dynax 7000i
Sample pictures
 Konica Minolta Film AF SLR manual downloads

135 film cameras
7000i